The 2019–20 season was the 2nd season of Juventus U23 and the club's 2nd consecutive season in the Serie C, the third level of Italian football. Juventus won their first trophy in their history: the Coppa Italia Serie C after beating 2–1 Ternana. Juventus U23 finished 10th in the regular season, and qualified for the first round of the promotion play-offs. They were eliminated in the quarter-finals against Carrarese after 2–2 draw being eliminated due to the opponent's higher classification in the regular season.

The regular season was suspended and then cancelled due to the COVID-19 pandemic in Italy.

Serie C 

 Results list Juventus U23's goal tally first.

Serie C play-offs

Coppa Italia Serie C

References 

Juventus Next Gen seasons
Italian football clubs 2019–20 season